The second season of the American superhero television series The Boys, the first series in the franchise based on the comic book series of the same name written by Garth Ennis and Darick Robertson, was developed for television by American writer and television producer Eric Kripke. The season was produced by Sony Pictures Television in association with Point Grey Pictures, Original Film, Kripke Enterprises, Kickstart Entertainment and KFL Nightsky Productions.

The show's second season stars Karl Urban, Jack Quaid, Antony Starr, Erin Moriarty, Dominique McElligott, Jessie T. Usher, Laz Alonso, Chace Crawford, Tomer Kapon, Karen Fukuhara, Nathan Mitchell, Colby Minifie and Aya Cash. The story continues the conflict between the two groups with the eponymous Boys, now with the aid of Starlight continuing their efforts to defeat Vought despite being wanted by the government. The conflict is worsened when Butcher learns that Becca is still alive and is being held captive by Vought with a superpowered son fathered by Homelander. While Butcher attempts to rescue his wife, Stormfront, a new superhero with a secret past, joins the Seven and subtly promotes her message throughout the world, with the hopes of convincing an unwitting Homelander to lead Supes to world domination.

Unlike the previous season, the season released its episodes on the streaming service Amazon Prime Video on a weekly basis with the first three episodes premiering on September 4, 2020, and the rest running until October 9, 2020. The season received record viewership for Amazon Prime and critical acclaim, with high praise towards the humor, themes, screenplay, storyline, and performances, especially Urban, Starr, and Cash. It also became the best reviewed superhero show of the year. On July 23, 2020, the series was renewed for a third season and several spin-offs, forming a franchise.

Episodes

Cast and characters

Main

 Karl Urban as William "Billy" Butcher
 Jack Quaid as Hugh "Hughie" Campbell Jr.
 Antony Starr as John / Homelander
 Erin Moriarty as Annie January / Starlight
 Dominique McElligott as Maggie Shaw / Queen Maeve
 Jessie T. Usher as Reggie Franklin / A-Train
 Laz Alonso as Marvin T. "Mother's" Milk / MM
 Chace Crawford as Kevin Moskowitz / The Deep
 Tomer Capon as Serge / Frenchie
 Karen Fukuhara as Kimiko Miyashiro / the Female
 Nathan Mitchell as Black Noir
 Colby Minifie as Ashley Barrett
 Aya Cash as Klara Risinger / Liberty / Stormfront

Recurring
 Shantel VanSanten as Becca Butcher
 Giancarlo Esposito as Stan Edgar
 Langston Kerman as Eagle the Archer
 Jessica Hecht as Carol Mannheim
 Abraham Lim as Kenji Miyashiro
 Jordana Lajoie as Cherie Sinclair 
 Nicola Correia-Damude as Elena
 Cameron Crovetti as Ryan Butcher
 Laila Robins as Grace Mallory
 Ann Cusack as Donna January
 Claudia Doumit as Victoria "Vic" Neuman
 Katy Breier as Cassandra Schwartz
 Shawn Ashmore as Lamplighter 
 Goran Višnjić as Alastair Adana

Guest
 Elisabeth Shue as Madelyn Stillwell
 Jennifer Esposito as Susan Raynor
 David Thompson as Gecko 
 Chris Mark as Blindspot 
 Malcolm Barrett as Seth Reed
 Adrian Holmes as the voice of Dr. Park 
 P. J. Byrne as Adam Bourke 
 Dawnn Lewis as Valerie Hunter
 Howard Campbell as Myron Hunter 
 Barbara Gordon as Judy Atkinson 
 Andrew Jackson as Love Sausage 
 Jason Gray-Stanford as Dennis 
 Ess Hödlmoser as Cindy 
 Michael Ayres as Jay 
 John Noble as Sam Butcher
 Lesley Nicol as Connie Butcher 
 John Doman as Jonah Vogelbaum
 Mishka Thébaud as Shockwave
 Dan Darin-Zanco as Doppelganger
 Samer Salem as Naqib
 Jim Beaver as Robert "Bob" Singer
 Nalini Ingrita as Janine

Chris Hansen, Maria Menounos, Greg Grunberg, Nancy O'Dell, Katie Couric, and Christopher Lennertz made cameo appearances for the show in the episodes "The Big Ride", "Nothing Like It in the World", "We Gotta Go Now", and "The Bloody Doors Off" respectively. Greg Zajac, Anthony Lake, and Dylan Moscovitch also make cameo appearances for the fictional film within the series as pornographic impersonators of Homelander, Jack from Jupiter, and the Deep for the episode "Butcher, Baker, Candlestick Maker", while Kym Wyatt McKenzie and Birgitte Solem appear as impersonation of Butcher and Stillwell in a reenactment for the latter's death for the episode "The Big Ride".

Production

Development
On July 19, 2019, just a week before the first season's release at the San Diego Comic-Con@Home it was announced that Amazon Prime Video renewed the series for a second season. Kripke alongside other writers had already begun to work in the scripts, just two days before the confirmation of the renewal. Kripke admitted feeling stressed while writing the second season feeling that it took a lot of tiptoeing around expectations for the hit's sophomore outing. The scripts were completed in November 2019. New Zealand actor Karl Urban confirmed through a post on his Instagram account that production has wrapped and revealed that the second season would premiere on mid-2020.

In an interview Kripke revealed that for the second season, the eponymous team of the show would be wanted criminals that are being hunted and that Homelander will be now free from the control of Stillwell. He teased that for the season it was expected to feature issues like white nationalism, white supremacy, systemic racism, xenophobia, and how the people trying to convey these hateful ideologies would be using the new forms of communication like social media to pass these ideas: "I will admit that I'm pretty angry about the way things are, and one advantage that I don't take for granted is I have a show that I can put some of my feelings into. I would say that there might be even a little more of the topical issues this season because the writers are a little angrier as well." The scripts were written during the period of the election season in 2018, where the president shared his fears of the immigrants jeopardizing the American life, a major theme that would be explored in the show. The season introduces Stormfront, a character whom Kripke was already planning to introduce for the second season even though before the show was renewed, but Kripke revealed that the character would be gender swapped for the show. He explained that the character "has a very hateful ideology, but they were really interested in modernizing it and how it's sort of often expressed today." It was confirmed that the show would consist of eight episodes like the previous season.

Writing
Kripke teased that the first season cliffhanger ending would set up for something bigger for the season: "Once you end up on that season 1 cliffhanger, you know that's going to be a big part of season 2, you know that Stillwell's death is going to be a big part of season 2, and superheroes being in the military." Unlike the comics where Becca is killed when she gives birth, in the series she eventually survives and is being held captive by Vought with his son. He revealed that Becca was not killed due to not wanting to use the overused convention of killing off female characters to motivate the heroes and it was also used as an opportunity to surprise readers of the comics by changing the story Becca. Another major change is Becca's child, who in the comics he was killed by Billy when the infant attacked him with his laser eyes. Kripke revealed that he changed this for the following reason: "You have this kid who's half human and half monster; half the person Butcher loves most in the world and half the person Butcher hates most in the world. That's just too perfect a character to not keep alive." In the series the child is named Ryan and grows with his mother under the captivity of Vought, who has the potential of developing the same powers of Homelander.

A major theme that is portrayed in the show is the white supremacy and how it affects the life of several people, with Kripke discussing how the strong character are the priority number one with The Boys, though the team tries to include commentary pertaining to the real world: "We're going after white nationalism in Season 2. We're going after systemic racism in Season 2. And all of those things really fucking suck." In an interview Kripke explains the portrayal of the xenophobia and white supremacy in the show and how major corporations are in part responsible of this: "[Between season 1 and season 2], we got deeper and deeper into the administration, and I think we as the writers got angrier and angrier. I think there were things like the travel ban happened when we were starting to break season 2, and a lot of the fear of caravans coming over the border to destroy you, and putting children in cages. That made us really want to talk about how white nationalism, and using xenophobia to further their own interests. Corporations are just letting it happen." Another theme that the show portrays is the feminism, as Stormfront is portrayed as a feminist who sticks up for the harangued women of The Seven even though she is also portrayed as a racist and xenophobic superhero. It is considered that the show portrays the feminism and succeeds where the MCU fails, as it illustrated the importance of women to the superhero genre as the female characters become stronger as the show progresses.

The season also makes the introduction of Stormfront, the newest member of The Seven. However unlike the comics where the character is male, it was revealed that in the series would be portrayed as a female with the intention of creating "Homelander's worst nightmare that would be a strong woman who wasn't afraid of him and proceeded to steal his spotlight." For the introduction of the character, Kripke decided to introduce the character initially as a calm and likable character with the intention of hiding her true colors until the third episode, with the intention of reflecting of how people are not always what they seem in the social media or the public. He revealed that the reason of why decided to introduce the character for the season, was to explain the nationalism and xenophobia to reflect it of how this concepts affect a lot of people in the real life. The character has been described as a very evil racist character who use racial slurs that is willing to kill people of color if she can get away with it, including innocent people.

Casting
Karl Urban, Erin Moriarty, Jack Quaid, Antony Starr, Dominique McElligot, Jessie T. Usher, Laz Alonso, Chace Crawford, Tomer Capon, Karen Fukuhara, and Nathan Mitchell reprised their roles from the first season as Billy Butcher, Starlight, Hughie Campbell, Homelander, Queen Maeve, A-Train, Mother's Milk, The Deep, Frenchie, The Female, and Black Noir respectively. In July 2019, Aya Cash closed a deal with Amazon to join the show as Stormfront, though it was not until March 2020, when it was confirmed that Cash would be forming part of the second season showing the first look of her character. Shantel VanSanten also reprises her role as Becca Butcher in a more expanded role than the previous season. She revealed that season two explores how she manages to reunite with Billy, but then being pulled apart as she is killed at the end of the season ton conclude her storyline for good: "I trust their storytelling and I know that there's so much of wherever it goes, especially for Ryan, that Becca will always be a part of it, and a part of Butcher and a part of Ryan and they'll go on to honor that, just as though we do for people that we've lost."

Elisabeth Shue returned as a guest star on the fourth episode titled "Nothing Like It in the World", as a doppelgänger of Madelyn Stillwell. On September 5, 2019, Goran Višnjić and Claudia Doumit were cast in recurring roles for the second season. A month later, Patton Oswalt was announced to be part of the show for an unspecified role. Giancarlo Esposito was confirmed to reprise his role as Stan Edgar, with Kripke revealing that he would have an expanded role for the season.  Esposito explained that his character was not afraid of Homelander: "I don't believe Stan Edgar has any fear of Homelander at all. And when I was doing the scene, I thought, 'Just think in regards to being very calm, and dealing with a child, but with respect.' But also, you can't forget the vision of how Homelander could take you out. So in the back of my mind, I've got Compound V in my blood, so I'm not worried at all." On August 10, 2020, it was reported that Shawn Ashmore joined the cast as Lamplighter for the second season. In September 2020, it was confirmed that John Noble would be making a guest appearance in the seventh episode of the season as Billy's father Sam Butcher.

Filming
Like the previous season, it was confirmed that despite the show taking place in New York City, the filming for the second season would be taking place in Toronto, Canada. The filming for the second season officially started on July 17, 2019, with the intention of getting a 2020 release. On November 1, 2019, Kripke confirmed that the production of the show has officially wrapped, with the release of a short film through Twitter of Homelander killing his adoptive mother when he was a kid. During the filming, it was revealed that a planned scene involving a rogue superhero attacking an assembled crowd was slated to be filmed at Mel Lastman Square. However they were forced to relocate by the Toronto City Council, due to the planned filming location being close of the place where the Toronto van attack occurred on April 23, 2018, in order to avoid hurting the sentiments of the citizens of Toronto. 

The crew filmed at the Roy Thomson Hall and then it was CGI edited to bring the exterior of the tower of Vought corporation. The interior was also used to film the rooms of the fictional tower. For Translucent's funeral ceremony, the crew filmed at the Meridian Arts Centre which is located at the North York district in Toronto, Ontario, though the centre exterior took place at the North York Civic Centre. The crew filmed at the Wet 'n' Wild Toronto Waterpark for the scene where the Deep is arrested, with few CGI modifications in order to recreate the series fictional park the Splash Zone Sandusky. For the scenes of the church of the Collective, where filmed at the Scottish Rite Club in Hamilton, Ontario. To create the Sage Grove psychiatric hospital, the crew filmed at the Southwest Centre for Forensic Mental Health Care complex, which is located in St. Thomas, Ontario. The scenes of the store basement where The Boys hid from the authorities is actually a store found at the Weston Road, near Lawrence. The upstairs room of the Sneaky Dee's bar was used for the scene where Billi Butcher in a self-destructive mood picks up a fight, after Becca refused to leave with him.

Visual effects
The visual effects for The Boys were created by ILM, Rising Sun Pictures, Rocket Science VFX, Rodeo FX, Ollin VFX, Soho VFX, Rhythm & Hues, Method Studios, and Studio 8. Stephan Fleet returned as the VFX supervisor. The scene where The Boys are chased on a speed boat, revealed that the set for the scene was built while the whale was entirely made of CGI. Fleet revealed that they only used one blue screen while filming the scene: "It's with The Deep when the whale crests out of the water and you see his body on there. We knew it couldn't be a digi-double if he gets too close to the camera." A real boat was created was built on a special slide to achieve the sequence where the boat goes into the whale. Over 150 of gallons of practical blood was used to spatter on the actors with the VFX being integral for adding water splashes and making both the inside and outside of Lucy generally look wetter and therefore more alive.

For the Sage Grove mental institution, the array of prisoners in cells were shot back and forth between two cells for about 12 hours with a GoPro to proceed with the visual effects to alter the shots taken to get the scares and the pain of the prisoners. To create the fake vomit of the Acid Man, the team crafted it out out of a vegan jell so they had to run a tube up to the actor's mouth and then shoot the fake vomit on the fake sandwich. The team proceeded to add the deadly CG enhanced acid effect once they got it done. For the Squeezer scene, the team created a special effect called "blood lollipop" by splattering fake blood at 360 degrees that they photographed. They proceeded to scan a stunt guy and proceeded to add the effect to ensure the realistic effect. Another one was called the "Love Sausage", which was used for the scene where a 15-foot tentacle-like penis that nearly strangles Mother's Milk, they stuck a tube in his pants with some CG enhancement to get convert it into a real penis: "It's inanimate and we needed to create this thing that was aggressive. We needed to have details of male anatomy and it was gross, monstrous. Skin is one of the most uncanny valley situations, and we needed a lot of camera shakes to help sell the gag. It was definitely the most difficult piece to do. It's a giant dick monster, but, while shooting it, you have to treat it like an actual monster. As far as I know, it's something that has never been done in visual effects."

Music
Christopher Lennertz returned to compose the score of the second season, after composing the score of the previous season. It was released digitally through Madison Gate Records on October 9, 2020, alongside the release of the season's eighth and final episode. The soundtrack also features two original songs for the show. "Never Truly Vanish" was performed by Erin Moriarty for the season's premiere episode at Translucent's funeral with its music video being released on June 3, 2021. Jessie T. Usher also performed an original song "Faster" which featured the collaboration Aimee Proal, with a music video being released at September 1, 2021.

Marketing
The teaser trailer of the show was released on December 6, 2019, at the Comic Con Experience in São Paulo, Brazil. On June 26, 2020, the teaser poster for the show was released which resembles the cover of The Boys issue #65. The same two clips for the show were released with one being Stromfront's introduction and the other one showing the first three minutes of the season. On July 9, 2020, another teaser trailer for the show was released, with a new poster detailing wanted posters for the members of the eponymous team being released two days later.

A day before the release of the fourth episode, on September 10, 2020, a short film set between the first and second season titled Butcher was released with Karl Urban reprising his role as Billy Butcher and David S. Lee making a guest appearance as Butcher's old friend Jock. The short film explains how the titular character rejoined the main characters, after Homelander revealed to him that Becky was alive. On September 17, 2020, Death Battle released two episodes on YouTube featuring the characters of The Boys, sponsored by Amazon Prime Video.

Release
The second season of The Boys, premiered on Amazon Prime Video its first three episodes on September 4, 2020. The rest of the episodes would be now released on a weekly basis until October 9, instead of only dropping an entire season in a day like the previous season.

Home media 
The second season was released on Blu-ray as part of a six-disc box set of the first two seasons by Sony Pictures Home Entertainment on May 17, 2022. Special features included the Butcher short film, deleted scenes and a blooper reel.

Reception

Critical response
On Rotten Tomatoes, the second season holds an approval rating of 97% based on 103 reviews, with an average rating of 8.1/10. The website's critical consensus reads, "The Boys comes out swinging in a superb second season that digs deeper into its complicated characters and ups the action ante without pulling any of its socially critical punches." On Metacritic, the season has a weighted average score of 80 out of 100, based on 15 critics, indicating "generally favorable reviews".

Eric Deggans of NPR described the second season as "a wonderfully subversive, cynically entertaining piece of work". Brian Tallerico of Vulture commented: "The season premiere introduces new cast members without losing focus of what worked about the first year, and just about all of it bodes well for where the next seven episodes could be going. Strap in." Roxana Hadadi from The A.V. Club wrote: "All of those elements feel most in line with The Boys as author Garth Ennis imagined the series: A portrait of shared capitalist and nationalist corruption, entwined together to create a morass of exploitation and abuse." Ben Travers from IndieWire gave the series a "B" grade rating and commented: "The Boys is still an imperfect beast, but it gets so many parts right - I haven't even talked about the skilled stunt work or expertly staged action scenes - that you're likely to get caught up in its gorging satire." Lorraine Ali from Los Angeles Times wrote: "Pulling dark humor out of that caustic cauldron is not just a skill, it's a warped superpower. Even the most super-skeptic of viewers can agree about that." Sonia Saraiya from Vanity Fair commented: "Even in the midst of stunning brutality, the show has a sardonic sense of humor that keeps the story crackling." Dan Jolin from Empire praised the series for its dark humor and Antony Starr's performance and wrote: "Appropriately enough, Starr remains the, er, star of the show, the very embodiment of its black-hole-dark comedy concept: with great power comes a complete disregard for any form of responsibility, accountability or morality." Liz Shannon Miller of Collider wrote: "Perhaps the most important thing that Season 2 does is push the show's scope beyond the realm of capes and tights; its messages aren't subtle, but then again, neither is putting on a costume and fighting crime."

David Griffin from IGN considered the second season to be more profound than the previous one: "The Boys Season 2 continues its excellent form of balancing its comedy, over-the-top violence, and character development into a cohesive force of awesomeness. While a few lackluster storylines that never get resolved, there are plenty of meaningful moments sprinkled throughout." Daniel Fienberg from The Hollywood Reporter gave a positive review to the show: "TV's oddball superhero team-up genre is one that often coheres better in second seasons. DC's Legends of Tomorrow made a huge qualitative leap. Netflix's Umbrella Academy remained frustratingly uneven, but still tightened up its storytelling. The Boys, definitely better than either of those shows in its first season, didn't make that leap for me. It's still fun, quick-witted and, to its detriment, glib. But it's explodier than ever and you can take that to the bank." Nick Allen from RogerEbert.com was positive of how the show makes references that have been normalized in the American culture: "This is the season that helped me 'get' the appeal of The Boys, especially as it's more fun to spend time with these characters well-past their try-hard introductions. There's a totally indulgent nature to the series, the way that it offers such depictions of evil or extreme violence caused by pop culture icons, like an energy drink version of 'Watchmen.' And the world of Supes colliding with humans, based on the corruption of absolute power, can be a fascinating backdrop. But season two also proves that if the series is going to be so bloated and only sporadically punchy, it's never going to be as powerful as it thinks it is."

Kshitij Rawat from The Indian Express considered that the second season was crazier and bigger than the previous one and lauded the season finale calling it one of the best that he have seen in years: "If you like everything about The Boys' Season 1 — including the cynicism, brutality and the swearing — you simply can't go wrong with the second season. It turns everything several notches up. Due to a bigger budget, there is more action, bigger scale and more complex visual effects. It is not Marvel Cinematic Universe yet, and it certainly will never be, but it gets the job done. The social commentary is also bolder, and I daresay, The Boys is as brave as Watchmen in this regard." Jack Kleinman from Inverse praised Starr's performance and the action sequences by commenting: "The Boys is less about the action and more about what happens in between. If you ever wondered what Iron Man would actually do after having one too many drinks or what hanging out with Han Solo at the cantina was really like, The Boys has the answers. It's not pretty, but even after two brutal seasons, we still can't look away."

On Amazon, season 2 of the series saw initial audience review bombing with 49% of 1400 reviews left by September 6, 2020, providing a one-star rating, most of which praised the available episodes but criticized Amazon's weekly release schedule.

Audience viewership
In October 2020, it was revealed that the show audience increased 89% compared to the first season. Nielsen ratings revealed that 891 million minutes of the show has been watched placing number 3 on the Nielsen list, just behind Cobra Kai (2.17 billion minutes) and Lucifer (1.42 billion minutes). It became the first Non-Netflix show to appear on the Nielsen Top 10 Streaming Shows.

Accolades

References

External links
 
 

2020 American television seasons
The Boys seasons